Recurring Dream and Apocalypse of Darkness is an album by Acid Mothers Temple & The Melting Paraiso U.F.O., released in 2008 by Important Records.

Release

The album was released on CD and 1000 copy limited edition LP. The LP was available in two colors (orange and white) limited to 200 copies each or on standard black vinyl, limited to 800 copies. The LP version also contained extra two bonus tracks.

Track listing

CD

LP

Personnel

 Tsuyama Atsushi - Bass, Guitar, Recorder, Vocals, Alto Recorder, Bamboo Flute
 Higashi Hiroshi - Synthesizer
 Makoto Kawabata - Electric Guitar, Tamboura, Producer, Engineer, Tanpura, Audio Production, Audio Engineer
 Shimura Koji - Drums

Technical Personnel

 Seldon Hunt - Artwork

References

2008 albums
Acid Mothers Temple albums
Important Records albums